The 1931 South Carolina Gamecocks football team was an American football team that represented the University of South Carolina as a member of the Southern Conference (SoCon) during the 1931 college football season. Led by fourth-year head coach Billy Laval, the Gamecocks compiled an overall record of 5–4–1 with a mark of 3–3–1 in conference play, tying for eighth place in the SoCon..

Schedule

References

South Carolina
South Carolina Gamecocks football seasons
South Carolina Gamecocks football